The Gauli Glacier is a  long glacier (2005) in the Bernese Alps in the canton of Bern in Switzerland.
The glacier is famous for the 1946 C-53 Skytrooper crash on the Gauli Glacier and the following rescue mission, which was the first carried out by an aircraft (Fieseler Storch) landing on a glacier.

A lake is located at the bottom of the glacier, at a height of 2,146 metres above sea level. Its surface area is 0.28 km²

See also
List of glaciers in Switzerland
List of glaciers
Retreat of glaciers since 1850
Swiss Alps

References

External links
Swiss glacier monitoring network

Glaciers of the canton of Bern
Glaciers of the Alps
GGauli